Superornatiremidae is a family of crustaceans belonging to the order Harpacticoida.

Genera:
 Gideonia George & Martínez Arbizu, 2005
 Intercrusia Huys, 1996
 Neoechinophora Huys, 1996
 Superornatiremis Huys, 1996

References

Harpacticoida